Raphaël Éric Messi Bouli (born 23 April 1992) or simply Messi Bouli or Messi B is a Cameroonian professional footballer who plays as a forward for Chinese second division club Nanjing City and represented the Cameroon national team.

Club career
Bouli started his career in Cameroon with FAP Yaoundé in 2013. A year later, he signed for Canon Yaoundé where he remained for the 2014 and 2015 Elite One seasons. 2016 saw Bouli join APEJES, with whom he won the 2016 Cameroonian Cup with. In 2017, Bouli scored fourteen goals in twenty-four league fixtures. On 1 March 2018, Bouli joined China League One side Yanbian Funde. He made his debut against Nei Mongol Zhongyou on 1 April, prior to netting in back-to-back matches in May versus Qingdao Huanghai and Zhejiang Greentown respectively. Bouli moved to Iran to play for Foolad of the Persian Gulf Pro League in 2019.

Bouli departed Foolad in June 2019, after scoring one goal (against Esteghlal Khuzestan) in twelve games for the Iranian club. In the months following his departure, Bouli threatened to complain to FIFA, along with then-manager Afshin Ghotbi and former teammate Takafumi Akahoshi, regarding unpaid wages.

On 24 August, Bouli completed a move to India with Super League team Kerala Blasters. He scored eight goals for them, which included a brace over Jamshedpur on 13 December. September 2020 saw Bouli return to Chinese football as he agreed terms with League One team Heilongjiang Lava Spring. In April 2021, Messi Bouli joined Nanjing City. As of December 7, 2021, he scored 13 goals and provided 5 assists in 29 appearances for the club.

International career
Bouli made his international debut on 10 August 2013, playing in a 2014 African Nations Championship qualifier with Gabon. Years later, he scored his first goal in 2018 African Nations Championship qualifying in a game with São Tomé and Príncipe. In November 2017, Bouli was selected by the national team for a 2018 FIFA World Cup qualifier against Zambia. However, he failed to feature after remaining on the bench for a 2–2 draw. Months later, Bouli was called up to the squad for the 2018 African Nations Championship in Morocco. He featured in matches against Congo, Angola and Burkina Faso as Cameroon were eliminated at the group stages.

Career statistics

Club
.

International
.

International goals
As of 14 July 2019. Cameroon score listed first.

Honours
APEJES
Cameroonian Cup: 2016

References

External links

1992 births
Living people
Footballers from Yaoundé
Cameroonian footballers
Cameroon international footballers
Association football forwards
Cameroonian expatriate footballers
Expatriate footballers in China
Expatriate footballers in Iran
Expatriate footballers in India
Cameroonian expatriate sportspeople in China
Cameroonian expatriate sportspeople in Iran
Cameroonian expatriate sportspeople in India
Elite One players
China League One players
Persian Gulf Pro League players
Canon Yaoundé players
APEJES Academy players
Yanbian Funde F.C. players
Foolad FC players
Kerala Blasters FC players
Heilongjiang Ice City F.C. players
Liaoning Shenyang Urban F.C. players
Nanjing City F.C. players
Cameroon A' international footballers
2018 African Nations Championship players